James Barry (1689–1743) was an Irish politician. 

He was a Member of Parliament (MP) for Dungarvan in the Irish House of Commons from 1713 to 1715 and again from 1721 to 1727. Between 1727 and 1743, he presented Rathcormack.

References
 https://web.archive.org/web/20090601105535/http://www.leighrayment.com/commons/irelandcommons.htm

1689 births
1743 deaths
Irish MPs 1713–1714
Irish MPs 1715–1727
Irish MPs 1727–1760
Members of the Parliament of Ireland (pre-1801) for County Waterford constituencies
Members of the Parliament of Ireland (pre-1801) for County Cork constituencies